Sebastian Cossa (born November 21, 2002) is a Canadian professional ice hockey goaltender for the Toledo Walleye of the ECHL as a prospect for the Detroit Red Wings of the National Hockey League (NHL). He was drafted 15th overall by the Red Wings in the 2021 NHL Entry Draft.

Playing career

Cossa was drafted in the 2017 WHL bantam draft in the second round, thirty-sixth overall, by the Edmonton Oil Kings. As a rookie during the 2019–20 season, he posted a 21–6–3 record, with a .921 save percentage in 33 starts to finish tied for third-best in the WHL before the season was cancelled due to the COVID-19 pandemic. In December 2019, he posted a 6–1–1–0 record, with a 1.98 goals against average (GAA), and stopped 222 of 238 shots for a 933 save percentage, and was named the WHL Goaltender of the Month.

During the 2020–21 season, he posted a 17–1–1 record. He led the WHL in goals against average (1.57), save percentage (.941) and shutouts (4). By winning his first 12 starts of the year, he set a franchise record for consecutive wins in a single season by a goaltender. In April 2021, he posted a 6–0–0–1 record, with a 1.61 GAA, .936 save percentage and two shutouts, and was named WHL Goaltender of the Month. He was a finalist for the WHL Goaltender of the Year award, and led the Oil Kings to the best record in the league.

On July 23, 2021, Cossa was drafted 15th overall by the Detroit Red Wings in the 2021 NHL Entry Draft. On August 14, the Red Wings signed Cossa to a three-year, entry-level contract. Cossa was named the WHL Goaltender of the Month for the month of October 2021. He posted a 6–2–1–1 record in 10 games, with a 1.58 GAA, a league-best .943 save percentage, and one shutout.

Cossa made his professional debut for the Grand Rapids Griffins of the AHL on October 19, 2022. He made 21 saves and earned the win in a 3–2 victory over the Milwaukee Admirals. He was reassigned to the Toledo Walleye of the ECHL the next day. On January 21, 2023, Cossa earned his first professional shutout in a 5–0 victory against the Iowa Heartlanders.

International play

On December 1, 2021, Cossa was named to the final roster for Canada at the 2022 World Junior Ice Hockey Championships. Serving as backup goaltender to Dylan Garand, he won gold with Team Canada.

Personal life
Cossa was born in Hamilton, Ontario to Gianni and Sandra Cossa and raised in Fort McMurray, Alberta. Cossa and his family are survivors of the 2016 Fort McMurray wildfire.

Career statistics

Awards and achievements

References

External links
 

2002 births
Canadian people of Italian descent
Living people
Detroit Red Wings draft picks
Edmonton Oil Kings players
Grand Rapids Griffins players
Ice hockey people from Alberta
Ice hockey people from Ontario
National Hockey League first-round draft picks
People from Fort McMurray
Sportspeople from Hamilton, Ontario
Toledo Walleye players